The Universidad de Sta. Isabel, also simply referred to as USI or Sta. Isabel, is a private Catholic university run by the Sisters of Charity of Saint Vincent De Paul   in Naga, Camarines Sur, Philippines. It was founded by the Rt Rev. Francisco Gainza, O.P., Bishop of Caceres. in 1868 as the first normal school for women in the Philippines and Southeast Asia, named in honor of the university's patron, St. Isabel, Queen of Hungary.

History 
Colegio de Sta. Isabel was founded by the Rt Rev. Francisco Gainza, O.P., Bishop of Caceres. The administration of the school was given to six Daughters of Charity sisters who arrived in the Bicol Region (Philippines) on April 4, 1868. The school was solemnly blessed and opened on September 18, 1870,

A Royal Decree of Queen Isabella II of Spain dated January 11, 1872, granted to the Lord Don Fray Francisco Gainza, Bishop of Nueva Caceres, the authority to create a school for girls (escuela de niñas) which will be under the care of the Hijas de Caridad (Daughters of Charity). Consequently, Colegio de Sta. Isabel became the first normal school for girls in the Philippines and Southeast Asia under the name Escuela Normal de Maestras.

The school was opened on April 12, 1868.  
Colegio de Sta. Isabel achieved its university status in August 2001, and was renamed Universidad de Sta. Isabel.

Campuses
The main campus of the Universidad de Sta. Isabel is located at Elias Angeles St., Bagumbayan Sur, Naga City. An annex campus is located at Panganiban Drive, Naga City and a satellite campus in Pili, Camarines Sur.

Graduate school 

 DOCTOR of Philosophy
Major in Human Development Management   
 MASTER of Arts in education (Thesis Tract)
Major in:  Administration and Supervision, Guidance and Counseling, Filipino, Mathematics, Religious Education, Music Education & History   
 MASTER in Education (Non-thesis track)
 MASTER in Management
 MASTER of Arts in Nursing
Major in:  Medical Surgical Nursing, Community Health Nursing, Maternal Child Nursing & Nursing Administration (non-thesis program)
 MASTER of Science in Social Work

Higher Education 
 College of Health Education
 BACHELOR OF SCIENCE IN MEDICAL TECHNOLOGY
 BACHELOR OF SCIENCE IN NURSING
 BACHELOR OF SCIENCE IN PHYSICAL THERAPY
 BACHELOR OF SCIENCE IN RADIOLOGIC TECHNOLOGY
 College of Business Education
 BACHELOR OF SCIENCE IN HOSPITALITY MANAGEMENT
 BACHELOR OF SCIENCE IN BUSINESS ADMINISTRATION
 BACHELOR OF SCIENCE IN ENTREPRENEURSHIP
 College of Arts and Sciences, Teacher Education, Social Work and Music Education
 BACHELOR OF ARTS AND SCIENCES
 BACHELOR OF SCIENCE IN SOCIAL WORK
 BACHELOR OF MUSIC
 BACHELOR IN HUMAN SERVICES
 TEACHER EDUCATION PROGRAMS
 Bachelor of Elementary Education (BEED)
 Bachelor of Secondary Education  (BSE)
 Bachelor of Special Needs  Education (BSNed)
 Bachelor of Physical Education (BPEd)
 Bachelor of Culture and Arts  Education (BCAEd)
 Bachelor of Early Childhood  Education (BECE)

USI as National Historical Landmark 

In recognition of the important role the academe played in Philippine history, the National Historical Commission of the Philippines (NHCP) has declared the Universidad de Sta. Isabel (USI) as a National Historical Landmark by virtue of Republic Act No. 10086.</ref> In view of this declaration, Universidad de Sta. Isabel is now also known as the Heritage and Historical University of Bicol

At the unveiling ceremony of the historical marker, NCHP Chairman Dr. Rene R. Esclante said that USI is important in the history of the Philippines as this is the oldest school in the country and the first normal school for women built during the Spanish era, where traces of the old structures and even the courses offered still exists as to this time.

Notable Person

Alumni 

 Leni Robredo (14th Vice President of the Philippines) attended basic education department.

References

External links
Universidad de Sta. Isabel official website
http://filles-de-la-charite.org/home-2/

Universities and colleges in Bicol Region
Universities and colleges in Naga, Camarines Sur
Catholic universities and colleges in the Philippines
Nursing schools in the Philippines
National Historical Landmarks of the Philippines